Charles Downing (died 1841) was a Delegate to the US House of Representatives from the Florida Territory. He was born in Virginia, although it is unknown when. In his life, Downing studied law, and after being admitted to The Florida Bar, he practiced in St. Augustine, Florida. Initially, a member of the Legislative Council of the Territory of Florida, Downing was then elected to the Twenty-fifth United States Congress, and took office on March 4, 1837. Two years later, he was re-elected to the Twenty-sixth United States Congress, and his term ended on March 3, 1841. In 1841, Charles Downing died in St. Augustine, Florida.

His son, Charles W. Downing, Jr., was Secretary of State of Florida.

References

Sources

1845 deaths
Florida Democrats
Florida lawyers
Members of the Florida Territorial Legislature
19th-century American politicians
Delegates to the United States House of Representatives from Florida Territory
Year of birth missing